The Mitchell grass ctenotus (Ctenotus agrestis)  is a species of skink found in Queensland in Australia.

References

agrestis
Reptiles described in 1995
Taxa named by Stephen Karl Wilson
Taxa named by Patrick J. Couper